The lumbar nerves are the five pairs of spinal nerves emerging from the lumbar vertebrae. They are divided into posterior and anterior divisions.

Structure

The lumbar nerves are five spinal nerves which arise from either side of the spinal cord below the thoracic spinal cord and above the sacral spinal cord. They arise from the spinal cord between each pair of lumbar spinal vertebrae and travel through the intervertebral foramina. The nerves then split into an anterior branch, which travels forward, and a posterior branch, which travels backwards and supplies the area of the back.

Posterior divisions 
The middle divisions of the posterior branches run close to the articular processes of the vertebrae and end in the multifidus muscle. The outer branches supply the erector spinae muscles.

The nerves give off branches to the skin. These pierce the aponeurosis of the greater trochanter.

Anterior divisions
The anterior divisions of the lumbar nerves increase in size from above downward.

The anterior divisions communicate with the sympathetic trunk. Near the origin of the divisions, they are joined by gray rami communicantes from the lumbar ganglia of the sympathetic trunk. These rami consist of long, slender branches which accompany the lumbar arteries around the sides of the vertebral bodies, beneath the Psoas major.  Their arrangement is somewhat irregular: one ganglion may give rami to two lumbar nerves, or one lumbar nerve may receive rami (branches) from two ganglia. The first and second, and sometimes the third and fourth lumbar nerves are each connected with the lumbar part of the sympathetic trunk by a white ramus communicans.

The nerves pass obliquely outward behind the Psoas major, or between its fasciculi, distributing filaments to it and the Quadratus lumborum.

As the nerves travel forward, they create nervous plexuses. The first three lumbar nerves, and the greater part of the fourth together form the lumbar plexus. The smaller part of the fourth joins with the fifth to form the lumbosacral trunk, which assists in the formation of the sacral plexus.

The fourth nerve is named the furcal nerve, from the fact that it is subdivided between the two plexuses.

Divisions

First lumbar nerve

The first lumbar spinal nerve (L1) originates from the spinal column from below the lumbar vertebra 1 (L1). The three terminal branches of this nerve are the iliohypogastric, ilioinguinal, and the genitofemoral nerves.

L1 supplies many muscles, either directly or through nerves originating from L1. They may be innervated with L1 as single origin, or be innervated partly by L1 and partly by other spinal nerves. The muscles are:
quadratus lumborum (partly)
iliopsoas muscle (partly)

Second lumbar nerve

The second lumbar spinal nerve (L2) originates from the spinal column from below the lumbar vertebra 2 (L2).

L2 supplies many muscles, either directly or through nerves originating from L2. They may be innervated with L2 as single origin, or be innervated partly by L2 and partly by other spinal nerves. The muscles are:
quadratus lumborum (partly)
iliopsoas (partly)

Third lumbar nerve

The third lumbar spinal nerve (L3) originates from the spinal column from below the lumbar vertebra 3 (L3).

L3 supplies many muscles, either directly or through nerves originating from L3. They may be innervated with L3 as single origin, or be innervated partly by L3 and partly by other spinal nerves. The muscles are:
quadratus lumborum (partly)
iliopsoas (partly)
obturator externus (partly)

Fourth lumbar nerve

The fourth lumbar spinal nerve (L4) originates from the spinal column from below the lumbar vertebra 4 (L4).

L4 supplies many muscles, either directly or through nerves originating from L4. They are not innervated with L4 as single origin, but partly by L4 and partly by other spinal nerves. The muscles are:
 quadratus lumborum
 gluteus medius muscle 
 gluteus minimus muscle 
 tensor fasciae latae 
 obturator externus 
 inferior gemellus 
 quadratus femoris
 tibialis anterior

Fifth lumbar nerve

The fifth lumbar spinal nerve 5 (L5) originates from the spinal column from below the lumbar vertebra 5 (L5).

L5 supplies many muscles, either directly or through nerves originating from L5. They are not innervated with L5 as single origin, but partly by L5 and partly by other spinal nerves. The muscles are:
 gluteus maximus muscle mainly S1
 gluteus medius muscle
 gluteus minimus muscle 
 tensor fasciae latae 
 tibialis anterior
 tibialis posterior
 extensor digitorum brevis
 extensor hallucis longus

Function

Additional images

See also
 Lumbar plexus

References

Hsu, Philip S., MD, Carmel Armon, MD, and Kerry Levin, MD. "Acute Lumbosacral Radiculopathy: Pathophysiology.Clinical, Features, and Diagnosis." www.uptodate.com. Uptodate, 11 Jan. 2011.Web. 26 Sept.  2012. https://www.uptodate.com/contents/acute-lumbosacral-radiculopathy-pathophysiology-clinical-features-and-diagnosis

Loizidez, Alexander, MD, Siegfried Peer, MD, Michaela Plaikner, MD, Verena Spiss, MD, and HannesGruber, MD. "Ultrasound-guided Injections in the Lumbar Spine." www.medultrason.ro. Medical Ultrasonography, 20 Jan. 2011. Web. 26 Sept. 2012. http://www.medultrason.ro/assets/Magazines/Medultrason-2011-vol13-no1/10loizides.pdf
 
Zhu, Jie, MD, and Obi Onyewu, MD. "Alternative Approach for Lumbar Transforaminal Epidural Steroid Injections." www.painphysicianjournal.com. Pain Physician, 21 Apr. 2011. Web. 26 Sept. 2012. http://www.painphysicianjournal.com/2011/july/2011;14;331-341.pdf

Spinal nerves